Altai or Altay may refer to:

Places
Altai Mountains, in Central and East Asia, a region shared by China, Mongolia, Kazakhstan and Russia

In China
Altay Prefecture (阿勒泰地区), Xinjiang Uyghur Autonomous Region, China
Altay City (阿勒泰市), also spelled "Aletai", a city of Altay Prefecture

In Kazakhstan 
 Altai Town, a town in Kazakhstan, until 2019 known as Zyryan or Zyryanovsk

In Mongolia 
Altai City
Altai, Govi-Altai, a sum (district)
Altai, Bayan-Ölgii, a sum
Altai, Khovd, a sum

In Russia
Altai Krai, a federal subject of Russia
Altay, Altay Krai 
Altai Republic, a federal subject of Russia

People and languages
Altay (name), a list of people with the given name or surname
Altai people, an ethnic group
Altai languages, the languages spoken by these people

Other uses
Altai, a historical novel by Wu Ming
Rupes Altai, a feature of the geography of the Moon
Altay sheep, a sheep breed
Altay S.K., a football club from İzmir, Turkey
Altay S.K. (women's football), women's football team from İzmir, Turkey
Altay (tank), a Turkish main battle tank 
Altay-class oiler, a Soviet Navy ship class
Altai gas pipeline, a proposed natural gas pipeline between Russia and China
Altai (mobile telephone system), a Soviet pre-cellular radiotelephone service

See also
Altaysky (disambiguation)
Alt-A, a type of U.S. mortgage
Computer Associates International, Inc. v. Altai, Inc., a US legal case